Shiyuan Subdistrict is a subdistrict located inside of Shunyi District, Beijing, China. It borders Shengli and Guangming Subdistricts in its north, Renhe Town in its east and south, and Wangquan Subdistrict in its west. According to the 2020 census, Shiyuan Subdistrict was home to 68,302 people.

History

Administrative divisions 

As of 2021, Shiyuan Subdistrict was divided into 16 residential communities. They are listed as follows:

See also 

 List of township-level divisions of Beijing

References 

Shunyi District
Subdistricts of Beijing